Villa Barbarigo may refer to several villas in Italy associated with the Barbarigo family:

Villa Barbarigo, Noventa Vicentina
Villa Barbarigo (Valsanzibio)

Barbarigo family